The 1995 Central Washington Wildcats football team was an American football team that represented Central Washington University and won the national championship during the 1995 NAIA Division II football season. In their fourth season under head coach Jeff Zenisek, the Wildcats compiled a 10–3–1 record. In the NAIA Division II Championship Game, the Wildcats played a 21–21 tie with Findlay, resulting in both teams being national  co-champions.

The team played its home games at Tomlinson Stadium in Ellensburg, Washington.

Schedule

References

Central Washington Wildcats
Central Washington Wildcats football seasons
NAIA Football National Champions
Central Washington Wildcats football